Sugar Run is a  long 1st order tributary to the Youghiogheny River in Fayette County, Pennsylvania.

Course
Sugar Run rises about 2 miles west of Kaufmann, Pennsylvania, and then flows south-southeast to join the Youghiogheny River about 1 mile north of Holland Hill.

Watershed
Sugar Run drains  of area, receives about 47.0 in/year of precipitation, has a wetness index of 347.83, and is about 94% forested.

See also
List of rivers of Pennsylvania

References

Tributaries of the Youghiogheny River
Rivers of Pennsylvania
Rivers of Fayette County, Pennsylvania